This is a list of players to have played 50 games for one club in the AFL Women's (AFLW). The AFL Women's is Australia's national semi-professional women's Australian rules football competition. The following tables only include home-and-away matches and finals; practice matches are excluded from the totals.

Adelaide
Updated to the end of S7 (2022).

Brisbane
Updated to the end of S7 (2022).

Carlton
Updated to the end of S7 (2022).

Collingwood
Updated to the end of S7 (2022).

Fremantle
Updated to the end of S7 (2022).

Greater Western Sydney
Updated to the end of S7 (2022).

Melbourne
Updated to the end of S7 (2022).

Western Bulldogs
Updated to the end of S7 (2022).

See also

 AFL Women's games records
 List of VFL/AFL players to have played 200 games for one club

References

Sources
 Every AFLW player at AustralianFootball.com

30 games for one club
30 games for one club